"So Sexy Chapter II (Like This)" is a single by Twista featuring R. Kelly, and a sequel to their previous hit single, "So Sexy". The song did not appear on the original release of Twista's album Kamikaze, but was later included on the re-release as one of two new bonus tracks. While not as successful as the original, "So Sexy Chapter II" made it onto two Billboard charts in the US, peaking at 92 on the Billboard 200 and 47 on the Hot R&B/Hip-Hop Singles & Tracks.

Single track listing
 "So Sexy Chapter II (Like This)" – 4:03
 "So Sexy Chapter II (Like This)" (Amended) – 4:03
 "So Sexy Chapter II (Like This)" (Instrumental) – 4:03
 "Y'all Know Who" (Explicit) – 3:48
 "Y'all Know Who" (Amended) – 3:44
 "Y'all Know Who" (Instrumental) – 3:45

Charts

Weekly charts

Release history

References

2004 singles
Twista songs
R. Kelly songs
Songs written by Twista
Songs written by R. Kelly
Sequel songs
2004 songs
Atlantic Records singles